Bicolor or bicolour may refer to:

 Bicolour (flag), a flag of two color bands
 Bicolour, the flag of Haiti
 in the widest sense, any flag design with two colors, see List of flags by number of colors#2
 Bicolor cat, or piebald cat, a cat with white fur and fur of some other color

See also
 
 , including a number of biological species
 Two Colours (disambiguation)
 Bipack color, an early method of filming in color